Na Piarsaigh CLG Doire Trasna is a Gaelic Athletic Association club based in the Waterside area of Derry, County Londonderry, Northern Ireland. They play in the Derry GAA league and championships, and currently cater for Gaelic football.

Doire Trasna fields Gaelic football teams at U8, U10, U12, U14, U16, Minor, and Senior levels. Underage teams up to U-12's play in North Derry league and championships, from U-14 upwards teams compete in All-Derry competitions.

Football titles
Derry Junior Football Championship (1): 2017

See also
Derry Intermediate Football Championship
List of Gaelic games clubs in Derry

External links
CLG Na Piarsaigh website

Gaelic games clubs in County Londonderry
Gaelic football clubs in County Londonderry